Rockport State Recreation Area is a  state park located along the shore of Lake Huron in Alpena and Presque Isle counties in the state of Michigan. It is operated by the Michigan Department of Natural Resources and was established in 2012. The park contains limestone formations and an old limestone quarry. There is a deep water boat launch that can accommodate all sizes of watercraft. The park is located along the Lake Huron Flyway and is used to gauge the health of Lake Huron and its shoreline environment. Several ship wrecks can be found off-shore in the Thunder Bay National Marine Sanctuary including the Portland and the Portsmouth. The park was previously known as "The Rockport property" and is not far north of Alpena, Michigan.

In Alpena County, about 11 miles south is the Michigan Nature Association's Julius C. and Marie Moran Peter Memorial Nature Sanctuary. The sanctuary encompasses 95 acres and  Grass Lake. dwarf lake iris, bird's-eye primrose and eastern white cedar surround it, and running through it is Hamilton Road, Michigan's first declared "Natural Beauty Road" (1971). Rockport State Recreation Area was designated a Michigan "dark sky preserve" in 2016.

See also
 Negwegon State Park
 Thompson's Harbor State Park

References

External links
  Michigan Department of Natural Resources

State recreation areas of Michigan
Protected areas of Alpena County, Michigan
Protected areas of Presque Isle County, Michigan